Armando Muñíz (born May 3, 1946) is a Mexican-born American former professional boxer and former NABF welterweight Champion. Muñiz was a member of the 1968 U.S. Olympic boxing team.

1968 Olympic record
Below are the results of Armando Muñiz, an American boxer, who competed at the 1968 Mexico City Olympics:

 Round of 64: bye
 Round of 32: defeated Marian Kasprzyk (Poland) on points, 4-1
 Round of 16: defeated Max Hebeisen (Switzerland) on points, 4-1
 Quarterfinal: lost to Mario Guilotti (Argentina) on points, 1-4

Professional career
In November 1971, Muniz knocked out title contender Clyde Gray (29-1) to capture the NABF Welterweight Championship. The bout was held at the Auditorium in Long Beach, California.
Muniz made the last defense of his title in 1972 when he knocked out the favored Adolph Pruitt in eight sizzling rounds. Muniz, one of the most popular fighters in Southern California, fought twenty-three times at the historic Olympic Auditorium in downtown Los Angeles. In 1975, Muniz traveled to Acapulco, Mexico to challenge welterweight kingpin Jose "Mantequilla" Napoles. A 6-1 underdog at the opening bell, Muniz pounded on Napoles for 12 rounds. With the champion bleeding from both eyes, referee Ramon Berumen, after consulting with the WBC officials at ringside, raised the arm of Napoles. Most boxing experts have referred to the Napoles "victory" as one of the worst robberies in boxing history. Muniz was cited as the "uncrowned" champion until Napoles defeated him in a rematch. Muniz made two more unsuccessful attempts at the title in 1977, losing to Carlos Palomino. He retired in 1978.

Muniz, a college graduate, taught at Rubidoux High School in Riverside, California, for more than twenty years.

Muniz starred in Taxi (TV series) in season 2, episode 15 "The Reluctant Fighter".  He portrayed a retired, former champion boxer named Benny Foster trying to make a comeback.

Professional boxing record

|-
|align="center" colspan=8|44 Wins (30 knockouts, 14 decisions), 14 Losses (2 knockouts, 12 decisions), 1 Draw 
|-
| align="center" style="border-style: none none solid solid; background: #e3e3e3"|Result
| align="center" style="border-style: none none solid solid; background: #e3e3e3"|Record
| align="center" style="border-style: none none solid solid; background: #e3e3e3"|Opponent
| align="center" style="border-style: none none solid solid; background: #e3e3e3"|Type
| align="center" style="border-style: none none solid solid; background: #e3e3e3"|Round
| align="center" style="border-style: none none solid solid; background: #e3e3e3"|Date
| align="center" style="border-style: none none solid solid; background: #e3e3e3"|Location
| align="center" style="border-style: none none solid solid; background: #e3e3e3"|Notes
|-align=center
|Loss
|
|align=left| Sugar Ray Leonard
|RTD
|6
|09/12/1978
|align=left| Springfield Civic Center, Springfield, Massachusetts, U.S.
|align=left|
|-
|Loss
|
|align=left| Carlos Palomino
|UD
|15
|27/05/1978
|align=left| Olympic Auditorium, Los Angeles, California, U.S.
|align=left|
|-
|Win
|
|align=left| Pete Ranzany
|TKO
|6
|13/12/1977
|align=left| Sacramento Memorial Auditorium, Sacramento, California, U.S.
|align=left|
|-
|Loss
|
|align=left| José Palacios
|SD
|10
|06/08/1977
|align=left| Olympic Auditorium, Los Angeles, California, U.S.
|align=left|
|-
|Win
|
|align=left| Ruben Vazquez Zamora
|KO
|8
|17/06/1977
|align=left| El Paso County Coliseum, El Paso, Texas, U.S.
|align=left|
|-
|Win
|
|align=left| Zovek Barajas
|TKO
|4
|02/06/1977
|align=left| Olympic Auditorium, Los Angeles, California, U.S.
|align=left|
|-
|Win
|
|align=left| Antonio Leyva
|KO
|1
|20/03/1977
|align=left| Caesars Palace, Paradise, Nevada, U.S.
|align=left|
|-
|Loss
|
|align=left| Carlos Palomino
|TKO
|15
|21/01/1977
|align=left| Olympic Auditorium, Los Angeles, California, U.S.
|align=left|
|-
|Win
|
|align=left| Jimmy Heair
|UD
|12
|17/06/1976
|align=left| Dudley Field, El Paso, Texas, U.S.
|align=left|
|-
|Win
|
|align=left| Abel Cordoba
|SD
|10
|08/05/1976
|align=left| Inglewood Forum, Inglewood, California, U.S.
|align=left|
|-
|Win
|
|align=left| Ruben Arocha
|TKO
|5
|11/04/1976
|align=left| Chihuahua, Chihuahua, Mexico
|align=left|
|-
|Win
|
|align=left| Ruben Vazquez Zamora
|TKO
|7
|04/10/1975
|align=left| Olympic Auditorium, Los Angeles, California, U.S.
|align=left|
|-
|Loss
|
|align=left| José Nápoles
|UD
|15
|12/07/1975
|align=left| Mexico City, Mexico
|align=left|
|-
|Loss
|
|align=left| José Nápoles
|TD
|12
|30/03/1975
|align=left| Acapulco, Guerrero, Mexico
|align=left|
|-
|Win
|
|align=left| Hedgemon Lewis
|UD
|10
|03/12/1974
|align=left| Inglewood Forum, Inglewood, California, U.S.
|align=left|
|-
|Win
|
|align=left| Johnny Rico
|SD
|10
|07/09/1974
|align=left| Tucson Convention Center, Tucson, Arizona, U.S.
|align=left|
|-
|Loss
|
|align=left| Ángel Espada
|PTS
|10
|29/07/1974
|align=left| San Juan, Puerto Rico
|align=left|
|-
|Win
|
|align=left| Billy Lloyd
|KO
|1
|29/06/1974
|align=left| Olympic Auditorium, Los Angeles, California, U.S.
|align=left|
|-
|Win
|
|align=left| Roy Barrientos
|PTS
|10
|03/06/1974
|align=left| Toronto, Ontario, Canada
|align=left|
|-
|Loss
|
|align=left| Marcos Geraldo
|MD
|10
|18/04/1974
|align=left| Olympic Auditorium, Los Angeles, California, U.S.
|align=left|
|-
|Loss
|
|align=left| Eddie Perkins
|UD
|12
|22/03/1974
|align=left| Tucson Convention Center, Tucson, Arizona, U.S.
|align=left|
|-
|Win
|
|align=left| Walter Charles
|KO
|3
|08/03/1974
|align=left| San Diego, California, U.S.
|align=left|
|-
|Win
|
|align=left| Dave Oropeza
|KO
|3
|26/01/1974
|align=left| Tucson Convention Center, Tucson, Arizona, U.S.
|align=left|
|-
|Win
|
|align=left| Jose Miranda
|UD
|10
|08/11/1973
|align=left| Olympic Auditorium, Los Angeles, California, U.S.
|align=left|
|-
|Loss
|
|align=left| Zovek Barajas
|MD
|10
|11/10/1973
|align=left| Olympic Auditorium, Los Angeles, California, U.S.
|align=left|
|-
|Win
|
|align=left| Antonio Roldán
|TKO
|2
|06/09/1973
|align=left| Olympic Auditorium, Los Angeles, California, U.S.
|align=left|
|-
|Win
|
|align=left| Ernie Lopez
|TKO
|7
|26/07/1973
|align=left| Olympic Auditorium, Los Angeles, California, U.S.
|align=left|
|-
|Win
|
|align=left| Thurman Durden
|KO
|2
|07/06/1973
|align=left| Olympic Auditorium, Los Angeles, California, U.S.
|align=left|
|-
|Win
|
|align=left| Manuel Gonzalez
|MD
|10
|04/05/1973
|align=left| Tucson Convention Center, Tucson, Arizona, U.S.
|align=left|
|-
|Win
|
|align=left| Frank Kolovrat
|TKO
|4
|09/03/1973
|align=left| Tucson Convention Center, Tucson, Arizona, U.S.
|align=left|
|-
|Loss
|
|align=left| Eddie Perkins
|SD
|12
|30/01/1973
|align=left| Denver Auditorium Arena, Denver, Colorado, U.S.
|align=left|
|-
|Win
|
|align=left| Adolph Pruitt
|TKO
|8
|02/12/1972
|align=left| Anaheim Convention Center, Anaheim, California, U.S.
|align=left|
|-
|Loss
|
|align=left| Jose Martin Flores
|UD
|10
|15/11/1972
|align=left| Silver Slipper, Paradise, Nevada, U.S.
|align=left|
|-
|Win
|
|align=left| Eltefat Talebi
|MD
|10
|24/10/1972
|align=left| Valley Music Theater, Woodland Hills, California, U.S.
|align=left|
|-
|Win
|
|align=left| Percy Pugh
|KO
|2
|11/09/1972
|align=left| Anaheim Convention Center, Anaheim, California, U.S.
|align=left|
|-
|Win
|
|align=left| Ruben Vazquez Zamora
|UD
|12
|31/07/1972
|align=left| Anaheim Convention Center, Anaheim, California, U.S.
|align=left|
|-
|Win
|
|align=left| Prince Jimmy Hamm
|TKO
|2
|10/07/1972
|align=left| Inglewood Forum, Inglewood, California, U.S.
|align=left|
|-
|Win
|
|align=left| Cassius Greene
|TKO
|6
|19/06/1972
|align=left| Inglewood Forum, Inglewood, California, U.S.
|align=left|
|-
|Loss
|
|align=left| Raul Soriano
|MD
|10
|22/05/1972
|align=left| Inglewood Forum, Inglewood, California, U.S.
|align=left|
|-
|Win
|
|align=left| Mario Olmedo
|TKO
|1
|25/03/1972
|align=left| Denver, Colorado, U.S.
|align=left|
|-
|Win
|
|align=left| Peter Cobblah
|UD
|10
|18/03/1972
|align=left| Long Beach Convention and Entertainment Center, Long Beach, California, U.S.
|align=left|
|-
|Loss
|
|align=left| Emile Griffith
|UD
|10
|31/01/1972
|align=left| Anaheim Convention Center, Anaheim, California, U.S.
|align=left|
|-
|Win
|
|align=left| Clyde Gray
|KO
|9
|19/11/1971
|align=left| Long Beach Convention and Entertainment Center, Long Beach, California, U.S.
|align=left|
|-
|Win
|
|align=left| Gil King
|TKO
|5
|14/08/1971
|align=left| Anaheim Convention Center, Anaheim, California, U.S.
|align=left|
|-
|Win
|
|align=left| Chucho Garcia
|MD
|10
|17/07/1971
|align=left| Santa Monica Civic Auditorium, Santa Monica, California, U.S.
|align=left|
|-
|Win
|
|align=left| Mario Marquez
|KO
|3
|19/06/1971
|align=left| Santa Monica Civic Auditorium, Santa Monica, California, U.S.
|align=left|
|-
|Draw
|
|align=left| Oscar Albarado
|PTS
|10
|06/05/1971
|align=left| Olympic Auditorium, Los Angeles, California, U.S.
|align=left|
|-
|Win
|
|align=left| Cipriano Hernandez
|UD
|10
|18/03/1971
|align=left| Olympic Auditorium, Los Angeles, California, U.S.
|align=left|
|-
|Win
|
|align=left| Mike Seyler
|TKO
|3
|12/02/1971
|align=left| Los Angeles Memorial Sports Arena, Los Angeles, California, U.S.
|align=left|
|-
|Win
|
|align=left| James Caffey
|TKO
|7
|07/01/1971
|align=left| Olympic Auditorium, Los Angeles, California, U.S.
|align=left|
|-
|Win
|
|align=left|Jose Carreon
|KO
|1
|10/12/1970
|align=left| Olympic Auditorium, Los Angeles, California, U.S.
|align=left|
|-
|Win
|
|align=left| Crispen Benitez
|KO
|2
|12/11/1970
|align=left| Olympic Auditorium, Los Angeles, California, U.S.
|align=left|
|-
|Win
|
|align=left| Victor Manuel Basilio
|TKO
|4
|08/10/1970
|align=left| Olympic Auditorium, Los Angeles, California, U.S.
|align=left|
|-
|Win
|
|align=left| Walter Charles
|PTS
|6
|26/09/1970
|align=left| Valley Music Theater, Woodland Hills, California, U.S.
|align=left|
|-
|Win
|
|align=left| Bobby Watts
|PTS
|6
|03/09/1970
|align=left| Olympic Auditorium, Los Angeles, California, U.S.
|align=left|
|-
|Win
|
|align=left| José Valencia
|KO
|2
|20/08/1970
|align=left| Olympic Auditorium, Los Angeles, California, U.S.
|align=left|
|-
|Win
|
|align=left| Takuji Iwase
|KO
|2
|06/08/1970
|align=left| Olympic Auditorium, Los Angeles, California, U.S.
|align=left|
|-
|Win
|
|align=left| Eltefat Talebi
|TKO
|1
|23/07/1970
|align=left| Olympic Auditorium, Los Angeles, California, U.S.
|align=left|
|-
|Win
|
|align=left| Joe Adams
|TKO
|3
|16/07/1970
|align=left| Olympic Auditorium, Los Angeles, California, U.S.
|align=left|
|}

References

External links
 
 

Boxers from Chihuahua (state)
People from Chihuahua City
Welterweight boxers
1935 births
Living people
American boxers of Mexican descent
Mexican emigrants to the United States
Boxers at the 1968 Summer Olympics
Olympic boxers of the United States